is an athletic stadium in Aizuwakamatsu, Fukushima Prefecture, Japan.

It is one of the home stadium of football club Fukushima United FC.

External links
Official site

Sports venues in Fukushima Prefecture
Football venues in Japan
Sports venues completed in 2013
Aizuwakamatsu
2013 establishments in Japan